Aleksandar Ivović (born 24 February 1986) is a Montenegrin water polo player. He started his career at PVK Jadran, which is his first senior team to compete for. He was a member of the Montenegro men's national water polo team at the 2008 Summer Olympics. The team reached the semifinals, where they were defeated by Hungary and then lost to Serbia in the bronze medal match.  At the 2012 Summer Olympics, he was again a member of Montenegro's team, where they lost to Croatia in the semi-final, and then lost to Serbia again in the bronze medal match, this time 11–12. He is considered one of the best defenders of all time and by many the top in his position in the world as he can transform the entire defense of his team.

Honours

Club
PVK Jadran
Adriatic League: 2009–10
Championship of Serbia & Montenegro: 2002–03, 2003–04, 2004–05, 2005–06, 2008–09
Montenegrin Cup: 2006–07,  2007–08  
Jug Dubrovnik
Croatian Chanmpionship: 2012–13
LEN Champions League ; runners-up : 2012–13
Pro Recco
LEN Champions League: 2011–12,  2014–15, 2020–21, 2021–22 ; runners-up: 2010–11, 2017–18
LEN Super Cup: 2012, 2015, 2021, 2022
Adriatic League: 2011 –12
Serie A1: 2010–11, 2011–12, 2013–14, 2014–15, 2015–16, 2016–17, 2017–18, 2018–19, 2021–22
Coppa Italia: 2010–11, 2013–14, 2014–15, 2015–16, 2016–17, 2017–18, 2018–19, 2020–21, 2021–22

Awards
Swimming World Magazine's man water polo "World Player of the Year" award: 2018 
Member of the Second World Team of the 2000–2020 by total-waterpolo
Member of the World Team by total-waterpolo 2018, 2019
Fourth Top European Player in the World by LEN: 2018, 2021
Montenegrin Olympic Committee "Athlete of the Year": 2015, 2016 
MVP of the 2008–09 Adriatic League with PVK Jadran 
Top Scorer of the 2008–09 Adriatic League: 103 goals  with PVK Jadran
MVP of the 2009–10 Adriatic League with PVK Jadran
Top Scorer of the 2009–10 Adriatic League: 68 goals with PVK Jadran
Top Scorer of the 2010–11 Serie A1: 79 goals with Pro Recco
Top Scorer of the 2012–13 Adriatic League: 66 goals with Jug Dubrovnik
2012 Olympic Games Team of the Tournament
2020 Olympic Games Team of the Tournament
Top Scorer of the 2020 Olympic Games: 24 goals 
Top Scorer of the 2018 World League: 14 goals
Top Scorer of the 2018 European Championship: 17 goals
Top Scorer of the 2013 World Championship: 20 goals
Top Scorer of the 2019 World Championship: 21 goals
2013 World Championship Team of the Tournament
2019 World Championship Team of the Tournament
World League MVP: 2020 Tbilisi

See also
 Montenegro men's Olympic water polo team records and statistics
 List of men's Olympic water polo tournament top goalscorers
 List of World Aquatics Championships medalists in water polo

References

 juegosmediterraneos

External links
 

Living people
Montenegrin male water polo players
Olympic water polo players of Montenegro
Water polo players at the 2008 Summer Olympics
Water polo players at the 2012 Summer Olympics
Water polo players at the 2016 Summer Olympics
Water polo players at the 2020 Summer Olympics
1986 births
People from Herceg Novi
World Aquatics Championships medalists in water polo
Mediterranean Games bronze medalists for Serbia
Competitors at the 2005 Mediterranean Games
Mediterranean Games medalists in water polo
Universiade medalists in water polo
Universiade gold medalists for Serbia and Montenegro
Medalists at the 2005 Summer Universiade